Khaneh Hay Mehrollah (also Romanized as Khāneh Hāy Mehrollah; also known as Naz̧erābād) is a village in Jahanabad Rural District, in the Central District of Hirmand County, Sistan and Baluchestan Province, Iran. At the 2006 census, its population was 14, in 4 families.

References 

Populated places in Hirmand County